Joan of Arc: the Image of Female Heroism by Marina Warner (University of California Press, 1981 ) is a book about Joan of Arc, focusing on how she has been perceived by others over the centuries and how that perception has shaped her image.

Reception
The book has been reviewed in Newsweek, The New York Review of Books, the Chicago Sun-Times, and the American Historical Review.

1981 non-fiction books
Works about Joan of Arc
University of California Press books